Martyn John Bernard (born 15 December 1984 in Wakefield, United Kingdom) is a British athlete, competing in high jump.

Bernard has won a silver medal at the 2006 Commonwealth Games in Melbourne and a bronze medal in the 2007 European Athletics Indoor Championships.

In Osaka in 2007 he set an outdoor best of 2.29 in qualifying, and in the final after clearing 2.21 passed all the way up to 2.33, where he failed twice at 2.35. The reason he did this was, that he was injured and had to limit his jumps.

2008 Summer Olympics
Bernard represented Great Britain at the 2008 Summer Olympics in the high jump. He qualified for the final along with two other Britons with a jump of 2.29.

Personal life
Away from athletics, Martyn graduated from Liverpool John Moores University in 2007 with a 2:1 degree in psychology, he has recently started a law degree and hopes to pursue this as a career, when he retires form athletics. A natural entertainer Martyn is also very well known for providing spectators with his version of Gene Kelly’s ‘Singing in the Rain’ during the European Championships in Barcelona in 2010.

He is cousin to singer and Marks and Spencers model VV Brown and older brother of Luke Bernard.

Competition record

Personal bests
High jump, outdoor: 2.29 (2007)
High jump, indoor: 2.30 (2007)

References

1984 births
Living people
English male high jumpers
British male high jumpers
Olympic male high jumpers
Olympic athletes of Great Britain
Athletes (track and field) at the 2008 Summer Olympics
Commonwealth Games silver medallists for England
Commonwealth Games medallists in athletics
Athletes (track and field) at the 2006 Commonwealth Games
Athletes (track and field) at the 2010 Commonwealth Games
Athletes (track and field) at the 2014 Commonwealth Games
Universiade medalists in athletics (track and field)
Universiade bronze medalists for Great Britain
Competitors at the 2007 Summer Universiade
Medalists at the 2005 Summer Universiade
European Athletics Championships medalists
British Athletics Championships winners
AAA Championships winners
Alumni of Liverpool John Moores University
Black British sportsmen
Medallists at the 2006 Commonwealth Games